A Biersal (also spelled Bieresal and Bierasal) is a type of kobold (house spirit) of German folklore. According to Carol Rose, in her book Spirits, Fairies, Leprechauns, and Goblins: An Encyclopedia, biersal are sprites stemming from the Germanic mythology of the Saxony region and surviving into modern times in German folklore. This household spirit abides in breweries and in the bierkeller of inns and pubs.  In these establishments, the Biersal will gladly clean bottles, steins, casks and kegs that have been used in return for payment in the form of his own portion of beer. When not properly remunerated, however, they resort to mischief and vandalism by stealing or hiding tools and causing equipment malfunctions.

See also
 Kobold
 Gremlin
 Clurichaun
 Machine Elf

References

Bibliography
 Rose, Carol (1996). Spirits, Fairies, Leprechauns, and Goblins: An Encyclopedia. New York City: W. W. Norton & Company, Inc. .
 Thorpe, Benjamin (1852). Northern Mythology, Comparing the Principal Popular Traditions and Superstitions of Scandinavia, North Germany, and the Netherlands, Vol III. London: Edward Lumley.
 Leach, Maria, ed. (1984). Funk & Wagnalls Standard Dictionary of Folklore, Mythology, and Legend. New York: HarperCollins.

German folklore
Kobolds
Fantasy creatures
Fairies